Bolax bovei is a species of flowering plant in the genus Bolax.

References

Plants described in 1914
Azorelloideae